This is a list of fossiliferous stratigraphic units in Albania.



List of fossiliferous stratigraphic units

See also 
 Lists of fossiliferous stratigraphic units in Europe
 Geology of Albania

References 

 Albania
.
.
Fossiliferous stratigraphic units